Rock Steady Row is a 2018 American drama film directed by Trevor Stevens and featuring Diamond White, Logan Huffman and Larry Miller.  It is Stevens' feature directorial debut.

Cast
Isaac Alisma
Jordan Allen
Marcus Blake
Heston Horwin
Diamond White
Logan Huffman
Allie Marie Evans
Larry Miller
Peter Gilroy

Release
The film premiered at the Slamdance Film Festival in January 2018.

Reception
The film has  rating on Rotten Tomatoes.  Theo Schear of Film Threat gave the film a 3 out of 10.

Tom Kiesecoms of Screen Anarchy gave the film a positive review and wrote that the film "is a fast-paced blast of creativity that thrills as it exposes the oppression that is endemic to the college system as a whole and challenges the objectification that fraternities can foster."

Justin Lowe of The Hollywood Reporter also gave the film a positive review and wrote, "...Trevor Stevens’ stylish first feature should strike a chord with youthful audiences and genre enthusiasts alike."

Accolades
The film won the Narrative Feature Grand Jury Prize and the Audience Award for Best Narrative Feature at the Slamdance Film Festival.

References

External links
 
 

American drama films
2010s English-language films
2010s American films